Karre is a Dutch surname, derived from the Gaulish word carrum meaning 'cart' or 'wagon', most likely left over from Gallia Belgica. Found in France as Carron or Carrier, which both have the same meaning.Kärre is a given name and surname. Notable people referred to by this name include the following:

Given name
Karre Mastanamma (1911 – 2018), Indian centenarian

Surname
Klas Kärre (born 12 January 1954 in Strasbourg, France) is a Swedish immunologist

See also

Kare (surname)
Karie (name)
Karle (name)
KARR (disambiguation)
Karra (name)
Karreh (disambiguation)
Karren (name)
Karrer
Karres
Karri (name)
Karve (surname)
Kyrre (disambiguation)